Atlantis Found is a 1999 novel by Clive Cussler, the fifteenth book in the Dirk Pitt series.

Plot summary
In 7120 BC, a comet hit North America, abruptly ending several advanced civilizations.

In AD 1858, a whaling vessel discovers a 1770s merchant ship frozen in Antarctic ice; included on this ship is a polished obsidian skull.

In the present, a group of U.S. scientists discover a mysterious underground chamber in Colorado, including a polished obsidian skull. They are attacked and left to drown, but U.S. National Underwater and Marine Agency (NUMA) Special Projects Director Dirk Pitt saves them.

Another chamber, like the one the scientists found, is discovered on a remote island and Al and Rudi Gunn head there. They make a significant find and are attacked by the same group as the scientists. Meanwhile, Pitt is aboard an icebreaker in Antarctica searching for the 1770s merchant ship and the other skull. He finds the ship and narrowly escapes disaster. A German U-boat, missing since 1945, is destroyed. Pitt dives on it and recovers the body of a female officer.

Both skulls found are given to NUMA for study and analysis and a theory about the possibility of them being Atlantean in origin develops.

The skulls are examined. Inscription symbols are found and they work on finding translations. Inside, geometrically exact globes are found; however, the continents and coastlines are different from current globes.

Pitt returns to Washington, DC, and interrupts someone – a twin to the U-boat officer – stealing the latest report from the NUMA director's office. She is captured and blood tests show they are enhanced as well as genetically identical – cousins, not sisters. The women are members of the Wolf family, descendants of Nazi escapees. They run Destiny Enterprises, a corporation based in Argentina that is rumored to include Fourth Empire Holdings from Nazi Germany.

The chambers turn out to be the work of a civilization calling themselves the Amenes (pronounced Ah-meen-eez), a nation of seafarers and wise men who discovered and traded with most of the world. The comet from the beginning of the book caused a worldwide disaster that wiped out most of their civilization. It also had a twin, which returned to space. The few Amenes that survived built the chambers to pass on information of the twin comets return and the catastrophe. This information is given to an observatory to be checked.

Dirk meets Karl Wolf, CEO of Destiny Enterprises Limited, and mentions the potential catastrophe. Wolf's reply implies that his family is planning to capitalize on the disaster.

The data from the observatory comes back: the prophecy is false. The comet will return in a few millennia, and it will miss the planet entirely.

It is noted that Destiny Enterprises is putting a lot of capital into four superships to save themselves and hold everything required for them to re-create civilization in the future. Dirk and Al take a tour of one of the ships and rescue, again, one of the scientists from the chamber in Colorado who was captured for her ability to decipher the Amenes inscriptions.

Information linked to a Nazi-built nanotech research facility in Antarctica comes to light. The plan that ultimately comes to light: the villains intend to use nanotechnology to separate the Ross Ice Shelf from the Antarctic mainland in order to unbalance the planet and create a catastrophe that they can ride out in their superships. Then they plan to re-create civilization in the Nazi image.

Dirk and his friends head there, deactivate the nanotechnology and deal with Karl Wolf, his relatives and workers.

Series continuity
It is revealed in the book that 'Dad' is in fact Clive Cussler himself. The fact that he appears in his own work is a recurring theme of the series. And as mentioned by Loren Smith, this is the first time where Dirk Pitt doesn't take back the form of transport used in the book (an old car/plane/boat etc.) to his hangar.

In another Cussler novel, Serpent, Pitt and other characters are mentioned in crossover, said to be going to "a Project in the Antarctic".

Dirk Pitt novels
1999 American novels
Atlantis in fiction
Novels set in Antarctica
Cultural depictions of Adolf Hitler
American thriller novels
G. P. Putnam's Sons books